The Victoria Bridge, also known as Jhelum Bridge, is situated between Jhelum and Sarai Alamgir on Jhelum River in Pakistan.

History
The bridge was built in 1878 by the British engineer William St. John Galwey. It is composed of iron trusses over many concrete piers. It has single railway track and a road on one side of the track.

References 

Bridges in Pakistan
Road-rail bridges in Pakistan
Bridges over the Jhelum River
1878 establishments in British India